Léon Lecornu (13 January 1854, Caen – 13 November 1940, Saint-Aubin-sur-Mer, Calvados) was a French engineer and physicist.

After his secondary education at the Lycée de Caen, Léon Lecornu obtained his engineering degree from École Polytechnique in 1872. In 1893, he was appointed professor at the Faculté de Caen, then at l’école des mines, and in 1900 at l’École polytechnique 1904.

He was elected a member of l'Académie des sciences in 1910 (section de mécanique).

He was the brother of Joseph Lecornu.

Bibliography 
Cours de mécanique, Paris, Gauthier-Villars, 1914–1918
Dynamique appliquée, Paris, Doin, 1908
La mécanique, les idées et les faits, Paris, Flammarion, 1918
Les régulateurs des machines à vapeur, Paris, Dunod, 1904
Note sur le laboratoire aérodynamique Eiffel à Auteuil, Paris, Gauthier-Villars, 1914
Sur la métallurgie du fer en basse-Normandie, Caen, Le Blanc-Hardel, 1884
Sur l'équilibre des surfaces flexibles et inextensibles. Suivi de Propositions données par la Faculté, Paris, Gauthier-Villars, 1880, 
Théorie mathématique de l'élasticité, Paris, Gauthier-Villars, 1929, réimp. 1967

See also
Rayleigh–Lorentz pendulum

References

External links 
Biographical information for Léon Lecornu
Léon LECORNU – Généa50 – GeneaNet
This article incorporates information from the corresponding article in French wikipédia

1854 births
1940 deaths
Scientists from Caen
French engineers
Members of the French Academy of Sciences
Grand Officiers of the Légion d'honneur
Academic staff of the University of Caen Normandy
École Polytechnique alumni
Academic staff of École Polytechnique